Jean Guy Dhombres (born 27 August 1942 in Paris) is a French mathematician, historian of mathematics and the mathematical sciences, and biographer of Lazare Carnot.

Biography
Dhombres graduated from the École Polytechnique in the class of 1962. He received in 1970 his doctorate in mathematics from Pierre and Marie Curie University (Paris 6), which is now part of Sorbonne University. He was from 1964 to 1971 a maître de conférences at the École nationale supérieure d'ingénieurs de constructions aéronautiques (ENSICA now part of ISAE-SUPAERO) and from 1965 to 1972 an attaché de recherche en mathématiques at CNRS. At the University of Nantes he was from 1972 to 1978 a maître assistant and from 1980 to 1988 a professor; from 1972 to 1974 he also taught at the École nationale des ponts et chaussées. In the 1970s and early 1980s he held visiting professorships at Bangkok's Asian Institute of Technology in 1971–1972, at the University of Singapore in 1973, at the University of Waterloo in 1975, at the University of Ottawa in 1976–1979, and at the University of Wuhan in 1980–1981. During his years in Ottawa he was also scientific advisor to the French Embassy in Canada.

At the University of Nantes, Dhombres was director of the Centre François Viète d'histoire et philosophie des sciences et des techniques from 1985 (when it was created) until 1995. He was director of studies in the history of exact science at the EHESS from 1988 until his retirement. Since 1998 he has held visiting professorships at the Technical University of Berlin in 1998, at the University of California, Berkeley in 1999, at the University of Geneva in 1999–2000, and at the University of Mexico in 2002–2003 and again in 2008. He was in 2004 a visiting member of the U.S. National Gallery of Art's Center for Advanced Study in the Visual Arts.

Dhombres was from 1983 to 1987 the president of the Société française d'histoire des sciences. He was the directing editor of the book series Un savant, une époque for the publishing house Belin éditeur in Paris. He was the founding editor of the journal Sciences et Techniques en Perspective distributed by Librairie Blanchard and has been a member of the editorial boards of several journals, including Historia Mathematica and Physis.

His mathematical research focuses on functional analysis. He has written extensively on many parts of the history of mathematics. Among his other honors, he was made doctor honoris causa by the University of Geneva in 1997.

He is married with two children and four grandchildren.

Selected publications
 
 
 
 
 
 
 
  2000
 
 
 
 
  (See Pierre Laffitte.)

References

External links
 
 
 
 

1942 births
Living people
20th-century French mathematicians
21st-century French mathematicians
French historians of mathematics
Historians of science
French biographers
École Polytechnique alumni
Pierre and Marie Curie University alumni
Academic staff of the University of Nantes